Tracey Breaks the News is a British topical comedy programme starring Tracey Ullman. It premiered on BBC One on 27 October 2017 following a one-off special that aired on 23 June.

After the success of the one-off special on 13 September 2017, the BBC announced that it had ordered three new episodes of Tracey Breaks the News. Like the pilot, the three new shows would "tackle topical stories and current issues in a sketch show written and filmed right up to the day of broadcast." It was also reported that Ullman would impersonate French First Lady Brigitte Macron and Labour Party Leader Jeremy Corbyn.

On 15 May 2018, it was formally announced that the show had been picked up for a second series, which began airing in June on BBC One.

The show has been re-cut and sold internationally under the Tracey Ullman's Show banner.

Premise
Tracey Ullman and her cast of characters sound off on domestic and global affairs.

Cast

 Tracey Ullman
 Zahra Ahmadi
 Chizzy Akudolu
 William Andrews
 Gemma Arrowsmith
 Ben Ashenden
 Anthony Atamanuik as Donald Trump
 Michael Brandon
 Jade Ewen
 Jason Forbes
 Steve Furst
 Tony Gardner
 Leila Hoffman
 Liam Hourican
 Laurence Howarth
 Martha Howe-Douglas
 Katherine Jakeways
 Dave Lamb
 Georgia Maskery
 Ben Miller as Rupert Murdoch
 Lucy Montgomery
 Dominique Moore
 Olivia Morgan
 Carlotta Morelli
 Aaron Neil
 Sue Elliott-Nicholls  
 Tracy-Ann Oberman
 Laurence Rickard  
 Christopher Ryan
 Dan Skinner  
 Samantha Spiro
 Nico Tatarowicz
 Brona C. Titley
 Tony Way
 Ben Willbond

Production

Development
Early in her career, Ullman made a conscious decision to steer clear of doing straight-up impersonations of celebrities, believing that it was delving into Saturday Night Live territory. She instead opted for "amalgamations" - combining elements of well-known people (look, voice, mannerisms, profession) thereby creating original characters. However, by the dawn of the new millennium, she felt that the world's celebrity-driven culture called for her to finally add celebrities to her character repertoire, and she did this with her show Tracey Ullman's State of the Union.  Critics noted a shift in the usually not overtly political Ullman. Union took on such lofty topics such as healthcare, immigration, gun culture, war, and the 24-hour news media. Impersonations included political figures including the then House Majority Leader Nancy Pelosi, the former First Lady Laura Bush, the former First Lady of France Carla Bruni, the congressman Barney Frank, political talking heads Arianna Huffington, Rachel Maddow and Meghan McCain, and the television news journalist Christiane Amanpour.

When the BBC approached her in 2014 with the possibility of returning to the broadcaster and creating a new show, Ullman was keen on doing a show about modern-day Britain and "national treasures", "which I think we have in England." Political figures such as the German Chancellor Angela Merkel and the Scottish First Minister Nicola Sturgeon would be impersonated. She saw Britain as a global hub, a melting pot, and she wanted to make a show about it. However, by 2016, Brexit loomed and the United Kingdom was voting to break itself away from the European Union. The irony wasn't lost on Ullman when it came to the show's original conception.

Two days before filming the second series of Tracey Ullman's Show, the Brexit vote in the United Kingdom took place, forcing the show's writers to do quick rewrites for its Angela Merkel sketches. The show had been filming six months ahead of transmission, which was proving not to be conducive to doing topical comedy. So when the BBC ordered a Tracey Ullman post-election special for the summer of 2017, Ullman came up on a new format and production schedule: the show would be written, filmed and transmitted close together, keeping the material fresh and up to the minute. "We've decided to shake it up with a more topical format because things move so fast these days – it's like, every 10 minutes I'm voting for something." The show aired on 23 June.

Whilst promoting the first two series of Tracey Ullman's Show, Ullman began petitioning for the return of the British satirical puppet show Spitting Image, feeling that there was a satirical gap in British comedy. In an interview with Rolling Stone she further explained, "I mean I came [to the United States] in Reagan's era. I grew up with Spitting Image being on in England at that time, a really political satirical show with puppets. We used to have the ‘President's Brain Is Missing...’ for Reagan. And they tried to stop that show in America. We have always turned to satire with Private Eye and go back to Beyond the Fringe, and that's what the week was [sic]."

The special (also the pilot episode) proved very successful, drawing a total of 4.2 million viewers: 2.4 million viewers for its premiere and an additional 1.8 million during its encore showing.

Unlike its predecessor, Tracey Breaks the News does not feature a laugh track.

Writing and filming
The series is filmed close to transmission and then ten minutes of topical material is filmed 48 hours before each episode goes out, "[W]hich is as close as all to Saturday Night Live as anyone in England gets at the moment," revealed Ullman to Rolling Stone magazine. "So if [Jeremy] Corbin [sic] or Theresa May, or something extraordinary happens, we can go in and do a piece about that."

On 13 September 2017, the BBC formally announced that it had ordered a first series of three episodes. In a press release, it was revealed that along with Angela Merkel, Nicola Sturgeon and Theresa May, Ullman would be adding her take on the current First Lady of France Brigitte Macron and British Labour Party leader Jeremy Corbyn. "I am thrilled to be allowed to Break the News again with my fantastic team of writers and performers. It’s wonderful that there is so much comedy to be found in the world’s current terrifying doom spiral. These are uncertain times, but I have my money on Angela Merkel to win the German election - don’t let me down Angela, you are like my Dot in EastEnders. Theresa May - hang in there, I’m not done with you yet, and Nicola Sturgeon - all power to your elbow hen, I promise my accent will be 10% better this season. I can’t wait to play new characters including the glamorous FLOF (First Lady of France) Brigitte Macron and a certain Labour leader, who we imagine has a marvellous sense of humour and will no doubt be delighted to see himself depicted by a middle aged woman (please don’t shave your beard off Jeremy, we’ve just had one made). Onward!"

Location filming began on 25 September.  Writing and filming continued the week of transmission.

In February 2018, Ullman revealed to writer and broadcaster Claire Fordham that writing on the second series had already begun. Filming on the new series commenced 30 April 2018. On 15 May 2018, it was confirmed that the show would return to BBC One on 1 June with a new series consisting of three episodes. A photo of Ullman made up as a British Conservative politician, and current Secretary of State for Environment, Food and Rural Affairs, Michael Gove, was released by the BBC on 16 May. It was further revealed that British politician Jacob Rees-Mogg, played by actor Liam Hourican, would be added to the show's long roster of impersonations. Mogg, presented as one-half of a double-act, is accompanied by his "very long-suffering Nanny." Also returning to the series is Ben Miller as Rupert Murdoch playing opposite Ullman as wife Jerry Hall.

Characterisations

The show encompasses a wide variety of world leaders and figures portrayed by Ullman. "I don't really impersonate them, I just try to interpret them, really."

Critics found the show’s take on British Prime Minister Theresa May both biting and sympathetic. The results of the 2017 general election have left an already beleaguered May searching high and low for any sign that she’s about to be ousted. Husband Philip (played by actor Laurence Rickard), is always on hand to lend an ear and offer emotional support whilst partaking in online gambling, betting on how much longer his wife will be prime minister for. Ullman describes May's voice as always sounding hysterical. "I know that English woman so well. She sort of talks like that. It's all very [as Theresa May] 'Well, let's get on, shall we?' She's a vicar's daughter from Maidenhead. And I know exactly where she’s from. My sister's the same age as her. We grew up near her. And you couldn't be more different me or Theresa May."

Ullman describes May's look as if Nosferatu and Oscar Wilde had a child. "She looks like the vicar from The Barchester Chronicles, the [Anthony] Trollope novel. She's just Dickinson looking."

Ullman admitted to being hesitant playing May right after the election and Grenfell Tower fire, feeling that it was the last thing she (May) needed. “I thought, can I do this? There's suddenly so much suffering this woman can go through and then Tracey Ullman impersonates her in primetime. It's like, leave her alone, you know? But then we did it and it was just fabulous fun and the nation needed it."

Ullman’s Angela Merkel has moved on from her crush on former United States President Barack Obama and has now set her sights on new world leaders such as Canadian Prime Minister Justin Trudeau and French President Emmanuel Macron (played by Ben Willbond), who she Skypes multiple times a day. "[A]nd his eye for the mature sex machine is of no relevance, Birgit, nein.” The one leader Angela does not relish conferencing with is United States President Donald Trump, or Herr Trump, as she refers to him. “He hates me, and I hate him more!”

Ullman was thrilled to get actor Anthony Atamanuik to play Donald Trump for the show. "I saw him during the election and I just thought that he was the best Trump. I mean, Alec Baldwin is amazing, but I love Anthony’s take [...] We wanted to have [German Chancellor] Angela Merkel and [British Prime Minister] Theresa May interacting with Trump and Anthony's like always in character as Trump so it’s perfect. He's been fantastic with what we’ve done so far. I'm going to have all sorts of people talking with him." His wife, First Lady Melania Trump is portrayed as a Westworld-style robot created by the Russian government who continuously malfunctions and has to be flown back for repairs.

Nicola Sturgeon, a Bond-like type villain, along with her henchmen, Mhairi Black (dubbed Wee Mhairi) continue in their quest for Scottish independence at any cost. Both the real Nicola Sturgeon and Mhairi Black have shown support for their portrayals in the show (as have Sturgeon's political rivals). Ullman did raise the ire of several online SNP supporters. While the show pokes fun at Sturgeon's repeated calls for referendums, Ullman says she admires her.

The show lampoons the entire political spectrum. Ullman, a lifelong Labour supporter, has been openly critical of the party in recent years, citing herself as feeling "party-less". The show’s 2017 post-election pilot episode features a sketch in which a newly elected Labour MP is sent to a "voluntary mandatory reeducation program" at Labour headquarters to be brainwashed into believing that current Labour leader Jeremy Corbyn (portrayed by Ullman in series one) has "defeated Toryism" and the number of seats won by the party are larger than they appear. A torture technique: sending Shadow Chancellor John McDonnell (portrayed by actor Laurence Howarth) in.

Jeremy Corbyn is portrayed as a politician keen on giving the impression that he's a man who understands the plight of "the worker" whilst reveling in his newfound celebrity. John McDonnell, evermore resentful of Corbyn who is making decisions without consulting him, fears what he's turning into.

On 25 October 2017, two days before the show's series premiere (and after photos of Ullman transformed into Jeremy Corbyn had been made public) the real Jeremy Corbyn joked, "Don't worry, Tracey Ullman's coming" at Prime Minister's Questions as they awaited the arrival of Prime Minister Theresa May. Upon seeing himself and Corbyn parodied in the series premiere, John McDonnell tweeted: "Absolutely brilliant. Even I thought it was me and Jeremy for a while. Satire at its best."

A sketch featured in the series 2 premiere episode (broadcast on 1 June 2018) drew considerable ire from Labour Party members on social media. The sketch featuring Ullman as current Labour Party leader Jeremy Corbyn references the political leader's ties to Gerry Adams, former Leader of the Sinn Féin, a friend of his from Hamas, and focuses on the public debate surrounding antisemitism in the Labour Party and Corbyn's reaction to it. Conspiracy theories and erroneous claims arose on Twitter from Labour supporters that Jewish comedian David Baddiel wrote the sketch's script, that Ullman was Jewish, and that the bit was part of a "Zionist conspiracy" against the party. Politicians such as George Galloway were also responsible in pushing the claims. Baddiel, who is an outspoken atheist, who is not a Zionist, and has nothing to do with the show, responded on his Twitter account: "Been told, hilariously, that Corbynistas like @jigsawman2014 have assumed that I wrote Tracey Ullman's JC sketch on her show: a brilliant example of how they truly eschew the idea of a Jewish conspiracy." Baddiel followed up, "This is the literally the weirdest conspiracy theory I've ever seen. I've now seen it stated as fact that I wrote that sketch. Maybe I should ask for royalties. Or will that confirm the stereotype for the antisemites?" Ullman, who is not Jewish, is a long-time Labour supporter, like Baddiel. Producer Caroline Norris added, "I have no idea where [this idea] came from. He'd be on the credits if he'd written a sketch for the show."  In reality, the Corbyn sketch was written by Laurence Howarth who also wrote a series of sketches for the show's second series mocking Conservative MP Jacob Rees-Mogg. Entertainers such as David Schneider, Al Murray, Emma Kennedy, Mitch Benn, a number of journalists, and actress Tracy-Ann Oberman, who's appeared on the show a number of times, came to the series' defense and condemned the antisemitic smears launched against Ullman, Baddiel and the show itself. Shane Allen, the head of BBC comedy commissioning, defended the Corbyn sketches because "attacking the left, right and centre is part of the whole point of satire." He went on to say that comedians and writers shouldn't be afraid of Twitter controversy because "Twitter is a playground for bullies, arseholes and cowards."

Episodes

Special (2017)

Series 1 (2017) 
An unaired sketch was released exclusively online by BBC Comedy on 1 November 2017 with the caption "So THAT's how they name hurricanes..."

Series 2 (2018)

Reception
The show has been met with positive reviews.

Awards and nominations

International distribution
On 30 August, American cable and satellite television network HBO announced that it would begin airing a third season of Ullman's former BBC show Tracey Ullman's Show on 28 September 2018. The network acquired exclusive broadcasting rights to the series in 2016. The third season will utilise episodes produced for Ullman's follow-up show Tracey Breaks the News. The show makes its international premiere in the United States as the third season of HBO's Tracey Ullman's Show at the 2018 Tribeca TV Festival. The event will be held on 21 September 2018, with Ullman expected to take part in a Q&A session hosted by actress Meryl Streep.

Aside from HBO in the United States, the show's international distributor, the UK-based DRG, has sold the show under the banner Tracey Ullman's Show to HBO Europe and ITV Choice in Asia as of September 2018.

References

External links
 
 
 

2010s British satirical television series
2017 British television series debuts
2018 British television series endings
BBC television comedy
BBC television sketch shows
BBC high definition shows
Cultural depictions of Angela Merkel
Cultural depictions of Donald Trump
English-language television shows
Tracey Ullman